Pomacea zischkai is a South American species of freshwater snail with gills and an operculum, an aquatic gastropod mollusc in the family Ampullariidae, the apple snails.

Etymoloogy
P. zischkai is named after Bolivian biologist Rodolfo Zischka, who discovered it.

Distribution
P. zischkai is endemic to Bolivia. It is found in the Chapare region, at an altitude of 400 m.

References

zischkai
Molluscs of South America
Endemic fauna of Bolivia
Invertebrates of Bolivia
Gastropods described in 1952